Ladji Keita (born 29 April 1983, in Dakar) is a Senegalese retired professional footballer who played as a striker.

References

External links

1984 births
Living people
Footballers from Dakar
Senegalese footballers
Association football forwards
ASC Jeanne d'Arc players
Ligue 2 players
Championnat National players
ASOA Valence players
Primeira Liga players
Liga Portugal 2 players
F.C. Alverca players
Rio Ave F.C. players
Vitória F.C. players
S.C. Braga players
C.D. Nacional players
Cypriot First Division players
Atromitos Yeroskipou players
AEP Paphos FC players
Chinese Super League players
Beijing Guoan F.C. players
Girabola players
Atlético Petróleos de Luanda players
Senegalese expatriate footballers
Expatriate footballers in France
Expatriate footballers in Portugal
Expatriate footballers in Cyprus
Expatriate footballers in China
Expatriate footballers in Angola
Senegalese expatriate sportspeople in France
Senegalese expatriate sportspeople in Portugal
Senegalese expatriate sportspeople in Cyprus
Senegalese expatriate sportspeople in China
Senegalese expatriate sportspeople in Angola